The Communauté de communes de la Région de Rambervillers is an administrative association of communes in the Vosges département of eastern France and in the region of Grand Est. It has its administrative offices at Rambervillers. Its area is 328.8 km2, and its population was 12,999 in 2019.

Composition 
As of 2022, the association comprises 30 communes:

Anglemont
Autrey
Bazien
Brû
Bult
Clézentaine
Deinvillers
Domptail
Doncières
Fauconcourt
Hardancourt
Housseras
Jeanménil
Ménarmont
Ménil-sur-Belvitte
Moyemont
Nossoncourt
Ortoncourt
Rambervillers
Romont
Roville-aux-Chênes
Saint-Benoît-la-Chipotte
Sainte-Barbe
Sainte-Hélène
Saint-Genest
Saint-Gorgon
Saint-Maurice-sur-Mortagne
Saint-Pierremont
Vomécourt
Xaffévillers

References

Rambervillers Region
Rambervillers